Wout Droste (born 20 May 1989) is a Dutch former professional footballer who plays as a right back.

Club career
Droste formerly played for hometown amateur club Quick '20 and the FC Twente/Heracles academy. He signed senior terms with Go Ahead Eagles in 2008 and moved to SC Cambuur after three seasons. He joined Heracles in summer 2015.

Honours

Club
Cambuur
Eerste Divisie : 2012–13

References

External links
 
 Voetbal International profile 

1989 births
Living people
People from Oldenzaal
Dutch footballers
Association football fullbacks
Eredivisie players
Eerste Divisie players
Quick '20 players
Go Ahead Eagles players
SC Cambuur players
Heracles Almelo players
Úrvalsdeild karla (football) players
Íþróttabandalag Akraness players
Footballers from Overijssel
Expatriate footballers in Iceland
Dutch expatriate sportspeople in Iceland
Dutch expatriate footballers